Yaroslavl was a Hansa A Type cargo ship which was built as Santander in 1943 by Deutsche Werft, Hamburg, Germany for the Oldenburg Portugiesische Dampschiffs Rhederei. She was seized as a prize of war in 1945, passing to the Ministry of War Transport and renamed Empire Gage. She was chartered to the Dutch government later that year and was renamed Arnhem. Allocated to the Soviet Union in 1946, she was renamed Yaroslavl. She served until 1971, when she was scrapped.

Description

The ship was propelled by a compound steam engine, which had two cylinders of 42 cm (16 inches) and two cylinders of 90 cm (35 inches) diameter by 90 cm (35 inches) stroke. The engine was built by Deutsche Werft.

History
Santander was a Hansa A Type cargo ship built in 1943 as yard number 429 -by Deutsche Werft, Hamburg, Germany for Oldenburg Portugiesische Dampschiffs Rhederei, Oldenburg. Her port of registry was Bremen. Laid down on 29 March 1943, she was launched on 13 August and completed on 21 October.

In May 1945, Santander was seized as a prize of war at Copenhagen, Denmark , where she was housing refugees from the Ostgebiete. She was passed to the Ministry of War Transport. She was renamed Empire Gage. The Code Letters GJFB and United Kingdom Official Number 180584 were allocated. Her port of registry was London and she was operated under the management of Ellerman's Wilson Line Ltd. In August, she was chartered by the Dutch Government. She was placed under the control of the Maatschappij Zeetransport NV and operated under the management of A Veder & Co. Her port or registry was The Hague and the Code Letters PCUM were allocated. When the charter ended she was returned to the United Kingdom and renamed Empire Gage.

In April 1946, Empire Gage was allocated to the Soviet Union and was renamed Yaroslavl. Owned by Sovtorgflot, She was operated by the Baltic Shipping Company. Her port of registry was Leningrad and the Code Letters UKEG were allocated. Circa 1949, she was transferred to the Sakhalin Shipping Co., Kholmsk.   She served until 1971, when she was scrapped in the Soviet Union.

References

1943 ships
Ships built in Hamburg
World War II merchant ships of Germany
Steamships of Germany
Empire ships
Ministry of War Transport ships
Merchant ships of the United Kingdom
Steamships of the United Kingdom
Merchant ships of the Netherlands
Steamships of the Netherlands
Merchant ships of the Soviet Union
Steamships of the Soviet Union